Onir (born Anirban Dhar, 1 May 1969) is an Indian film and TV director, editor, screenwriter and producer. He is best known for his film My Brother…Nikhil, based on the life of Dominic d'Souza, starring Sanjay Suri and Purab Kohli it was one of the first mainstream Hindi films to deal with AIDS and same-sex relationships.

Onir won the National Award for his film I Am. He has won 16 film awards in total.

Life and career

Early life
Onir was born as Anirban Dhar in Samchi, Bhutan. His father Aparesh Dhar and mother Manjushree are of Bengali origin. Onir spent much of his childhood going to the cinema. The family moved to Kolkata around 1990.

In Kolkata, Onir studied comparative literature and took a few film classes at Chitrabani film school. He graduated from Jadavpur University in 1989, but left before getting his post-graduate degree when he received a scholarship to study film editing at SFB/TTC in Berlin. He later returned to India and worked as an editor, scriptwriter, art director, music album producer and song/music video director before becoming an independent Producer and Director.

Early career
In 1992 Onir directed and produced his first documentary film, Fallen Hero based on painter Bijan Choudhury's life. He also served as an assistant to Kalpana Lajmi on Daman: A Victim of Marital Violence (2001) where he had his first experience directing a full-length feature film.

While working on a documentary about Dominic D'Souza, a champion swimmer and AIDS patient in Goa, Onir conceived the idea for his first film. His directorial debut My Brother... Nikhil (2005) starring co-producer Sanjay Suri and actress Juhi Chawla deals with the Goan government's harsh treatment of AIDS patients in the 1980s and the stigma attached to them. My Brother... Nikhil was screened at several international film festivals, and Juhi Chawla received an IIFA nomination for her role as the main character's supportive sister. The film was screened at over 40 international film festivals, and won the Audience Choice Awards in Milan, LGBT film festival, Best Film & Jury Audience Choice Award at Montreal, image+nation Film Festival amongst others.

In 2006 he released his second film Bas Ek Pal with Urmila Matondkar, Sanjay Suri and Jimmy Shergill. He received a nomination for the Best Director Critic's Award at the Global Indian Film Awards for the film. This film was not a financial success, only collecting 15–20 percent at the box office. His next film Sorry Bhai! also failed to do well as it released the week of the terrorist attacks in Mumbai.

Critical acclaim
Onir's eighth film was I Am, which consists of four short films exploring such themes as single motherhood, displacement, child abuse and same-sex relationships. I Am won the National Award in two categories; Best Film and Best Lyrics. It was also the winnerof I-VIEW 2010s Engendered Award (New York) for Outstanding Contribution.

Onir was awarded the 2008/9 Triangle Media Group Honorary Award on 7 February 2010, and won Best Film awards at both the London Asian Film Festival and the River to River. Florence Indian Film Festival. He won the IRDS film awards for Best Director for Social Concern.

In 2018 he received Likho Award (Trailblazer Award).

Onir has received the Diversity Award from Film Victoria Australia and La Trobe University at Indian Film Festival Of Melbourne 2019.

Onir received the Jury Special mention for Outstanding work On LGBT Issues at the Indus Valley International Film Festival Oct 2020.

Recent work
Together with Sanjay Suri, Onir started Anticlock Films, a production company that will concentrate on promoting young directors. So far Anticlock has promoted people such as Bikas Ranjan Mishra who directed Chauranga, which was released on Netflix India.

He also worked on Raising the Bar - an Indo-Australian documentary about six youth with Down syndrome, which won the Hollywood International Independent Documentary Award.

Onir fifth directional film titled Shab (The Night) starring Raveena Tandon, Ashish Bisht, Arpia Chatterjee and French actor Simon Frenay. The film was released on 14 July 2017. The film premiered at the New York Indian Film Festival and also screened at River to River Indian Film Festival Florence, Melbourne Indian Film Festival.

In 2017, a short film "Aaba" (Grandfather) that he co-produced premiered at the Berlin International Film Festival.

In 2017 Onir started shooting for his 6th directorial venture Kuchh Bheege Alfaaz with National Award winning actor Geetanjali Thapa and introducing a young Kashmiri actor Zain Khan Durrani. The film released in 16 February 2018 . The film won the audience Choice Award at the Jagaran Film Festival and has been screened at The London Asian Film Festival, Stuttgart Indian Film Festival, Melbourne Indian Film Festival and Karachi International Film Festival.

In 2018 Onir directed a documentary named Widows Of Vrindavan which won the Best Documentary at the Jagran Film festival 2019. It has also been screened at the Stuttgart Indian Film Festival and Melbourne Indian Film Festival in 2019.

Onir directed a documentary "SAMA: Symbols and Gestures in Contemporary Art of Italy and India" in 2021 which explores the world of contemporary art in the Indian sub-continent as well as in Italy and lends context by investigating the signs and symbols surrounding them in history and culture. It offers a glimpse into the aesthetics of the two regions, while also excavating rare forms of craftsmanship.

Personal life 
Onir has one younger brother, Aryan Dhar. Abhishek Dhar is a theoretical physicist at International Centre for Theoretical Sciences, TIFR Bangalore, adjunct faculty at Raman Research Institute and winner of the Shanti Swarup Bhatnagar Prize for Science and Technology. Onir's sister Irene Dhar Malik is a film and television editor.

Onir is an atheist. He can speak Bengali, Russian, German and Tamil. His favourite film directors are Ritwik Ghatak, Satyajit Ray, Luis Buñuel and Andrei Tarkovsky while he cites Shyam Benegal's Junoon as the reason he became a filmmaker. He is also one of the few openly gay directors in Bollywood.

Filmography

Awards and nominations

References

External links 

 
 
 

1969 births
Living people
Indian atheists
Hindi-language film directors
Jadavpur University alumni
LGBT film directors
LGBT television directors
Bengali film directors
Indian film directors
Indian LGBT rights activists
People from Thimphu
Indian gay writers
Indian male screenwriters
Indian LGBT screenwriters
Gay screenwriters